The 2010 GDF SUEZ Grand Prix was a women's tennis tournament played on outdoor clay courts. It was the 16th edition of the Budapest Grand Prix, an International-level tournament on the 2010 WTA Tour. It took place in Budapest, Hungary, from 4 July until 12 July 2010. Ágnes Szávay won the singles title.

Entrants

Entry list

 Seedings are based on the rankings of June 21, 2010.

Other entrants
The following players received wildcards into the singles main draw
  Tímea Babos
  Alizé Cornet
  Silvia Njirić

The following players received entry from the qualifying draw:
  Andreja Klepač
  Zuzana Ondrášková
  Michaela Pochabová
  Lesya Tsurenko

Finals

Singles

 Ágnes Szávay defeated  Patty Schnyder, 6–2, 6–4
It was Szavay's first title of the year and 4th of her career. It was her second consecutive win at Budapest.

Doubles

 Timea Bacsinszky /  Tathiana Garbin defeated  Sorana Cîrstea /  Anabel Medina Garrigues, 6–3, 6–3

References

External links
Official website

GDF SUEZ Grand Prix
Budapest Grand Prix
Buda
Buda